Federico Villagra (born May 21, 1969) is an Argentine rally driver competing in the Argentine Rally Championship. He had previously competed in the World Rally Championship for the Munchi's Ford World Rally Team. His co-driver is Diego Curletto.

Career 

After experiencing success in his native championship (including winning the group N4 class every year between 2001 and 2005), Villagra came to the attention of a wider stage by winning the group N class of Rally Argentina in 2006 and 2007. This led to his employment by the Munchi's Ford World Rally Team halfway through the 2007 season. He scored his first points with an attrition aided seventh place in Japan.

In 2008 he will again drive for the Munchi's team in the ten events that they are competing in. He was off the pace in México, which was his first event of the season, but still managed to finish seventh and pick up two drivers points. He improved again at his home event in Argentina, finishing a career best sixth despite reliability issues, and matched this performance again in Jordan.

In 2009 Villagra scored more points than year before and finished best at 4th place at his home-event 2009 Rally Argentina and also at 2009 Acropolis Rally.

At season 2010 Villagra changed his livery and continued in scoring points, he scored at least point 7 times out of his 8 rallies this year. Villagra got 36 points and 9th place overall. He also tried IRC with Ford Fiesta S2000 at 2010 Rally Argentina. Finishing 6th.

Racing record

WRC results

PWRC results

Dakar Rally results

References

External links
Profile at eWRC

Argentine racing drivers
World Rally Championship drivers
Intercontinental Rally Challenge drivers
Argentine rally drivers
Living people
1969 births
Dakar Rally drivers
Rally raid truck drivers